Ea Semper was an apostolic letter written by Pope Pius X in September 1907 that dealt with the governance of the Eastern Catholics in the United States. It dealt with the appointment of Soter Ortynski as the first bishop of the Ruthenian Catholics in the United States, together with papal instructions concerning his powers and duties. The general constitution of the Greek Rite in America was also published.

Contents
The letter created considerable dissatisfaction among the American Greek Rite clergy and laity since it did not provide for any diocesan authority for their new bishop. Rather, it made him an auxiliary to the Latin Rite bishops, some of whom (such as Bishop John Ireland, for instance) were hostile to the Greek Rite. Furthermore, it also modified several aspects of Greek Catholicism that differed from the Latin Rite. Confirmation was no longer to be conferred at baptism (as in the Orthodox church from which the Greek Catholics were descended) and could now be given only by a bishop (not a priest, as in the Eastern churches). No new married priests were to be ordained in America or to be sent to America. The pope's missive also mandated changes to the regulations governing marriages between persons in the Latin and Greek rites.

Reaction
Dissatisfaction with the letter resulted in many conversions to Russian Orthodoxy, particularly in America; it continued a movement that began in 1892 under Alexis Toth, who was later canonized by the Orthodox Church in America. Although critics would insist that Pan-Slavic nationalism was more to blame than genuine religious feeling, about 80,000 parishioners left Rome for Orthodoxy after publication of the letter.

The Orthodox Church in America claims that by 1916, the Roman Catholic Church had lost 163 Uniate parishes, with over 100,000 faithful, to the Russian missionary diocese.

References

20th-century Eastern Catholicism
Documents of Pope Pius X